Belirang-Beriti is a volcanic complex that rises above the Semalako Plain in the south-west of Sumatra, Indonesia. It contains a 1.2 km-wide volcanic crater.

See also 

 List of volcanoes in Indonesia

References 

Volcanoes of Sumatra
Mountains of Sumatra
Complex volcanoes